County routes in Suffolk County, New York are maintained by the Suffolk County Department of Public Works (SCDPW) and signed with the Manual on Uniform Traffic Control Devices-standard yellow-on-blue pentagon route marker. The designations do not follow any fixed pattern. Some route numbers are deliberately omitted in order to alleviate confusion with New York state routes (such as CR 109 and CR 114); however, this practice is inconsistent, as other numbers including 108, 111, and 112 are duplicated. These routes are officially logged inside the New York State Department of Transportation's "Local Highway Inventory", which lists all county routes for each county in the State of New York.

Routes 1–25

Routes 26–50C

Routes 51–75

Routes 76–100

Routes 101 and up

See also

County routes in New York
Bicycle Path
Old Country Road (covers the section not part of CR 58 or CR 71)
Sheep Pasture Road

References

External links

 Suffolk County Department of Public Works
 Nassau & Suffolk County Road History (NYC Roads.com)